School District 73 Kamloops/Thompson  a school district based in Kamloops, British Columbia, Canada.

The school board serves the city of Kamloops and the communities of Chase, Barriere, Clearwater, Logan Lake, Blue River, Brennan Creek, Heffley Creek, Pinantan Lake, Savona, Vavenby, and Westwold.

History
School District 73 was created in 1996 with the merger of School District No. 24 Kamloops and School District No. 26 North Thompson.

Schools

External links
 School District 73 official website

Education in Kamloops
Thompson Country
73